Colla opalifera (commonly known as Dognin's greasy roller) is a moth in the family Bombycidae. It was described by Paul Dognin in 1911. It is found in Venezuela, Ecuador, Peru and Brazil. The habitat consists of rainforests and cloudforests where it is found at elevations between 100 and 800 meters.

References

Bombycidae
Moths described in 1911